Rising Storm 2: Vietnam is a 2017 multiplayer tactical first-person shooter video game developed by Antimatter Games and Tripwire Interactive and co-published by Tripwire Interactive and Iceberg Interactive. It is a direct sequel to 2013's Rising Storm and is set during the Vietnam War. The game was released worldwide for Microsoft Windows through digital distribution platform Steam on May 30, 2017.

Gameplay
Like its predecessors in the series, Rising Storm 2: Vietnam is a tactical first-person shooter that emphasizes large-scale teamwork with realistic mechanics and combat. The game is set in the period of the Vietnam War, and many of the locations are based on historic battles. Players can make use of era-specific weapons, including automatic and semi-automatic rifles, artillery, flamethrowers, and machine guns. 

Rising Storm 2: Vietnams multiplayer pits up to 64 players against one another from either the South or the North in the Vietnam War conflict. Each faction features unique Roles and abilities, making the game asymmetrical. Players can choose between the National Liberation Front (NLF/VC) and the North Vietnamese Army (PAVN/NVA), against the United States Army, the United States Marine Corps, the Australian Army, and the Army of the Republic of Vietnam (ARVN).

For the first time in the franchise, players are able to take control of airborne vehicles, including attack, reconnaissance, and transport helicopters. Weapon and character customization also mark their debuts, including weapon and munition varieties as well as head, upper and lower body and skin customization.

Multiplayer modes
The game launched with eight maps and three modes; Territories, Supremacy, and Skirmish.
Territories: One of the standard two-round game modes in the series. In order to win, the attacking team must capture all of the objectives on the map before the round ends. The defenders win a round if they can hold on to their besieged objectives long enough to break the assault and successfully enter lockdown. Additionally, one or both teams can enter sudden death if their reinforcement tickets have been depleted which disables respawning. The last team standing wins. A team can win the game by tie breaker if they have more reinforcement tickets remaining at the end of the two-round match.
Supremacy: A new mode featured in the franchise. Teams capture objectives across the map, earning points based on the number of objectives they hold. A team wins the game if they achieve a greater score. Sudden death and tie breaker are also applied.
Skirmish: A different take on Supremacy with up to five rounds and featuring smaller maps for official eight versus eight player teams. Players must seize all objectives on the map and deplete the enemy's spawn tickets within the timer. Taking over an objective will replenish spawns.
Campaign: Returning from Red Orchestra 2: Heroes of Stalingrad and Rising Storm, Campaign has both teams battle each other through Territories matches to gain territory on a map of South Vietnam over an 11-year period. In order to secure victory, the winning team must either acquire and hold all territories or hold a greater number of victory points by the end of the campaign. Defeat in the campaign can result from mismanaging and depleting the team's combat power.

Development
Rising Storm 2: Vietnam was announced at the E3 2015, alongside an announcement trailer. It was being developed by Antimatter Games, the studio founded by the team who made the first Rising Storm.

The game introduces several features new to the franchise including stealth, tunneling and player-controlled military helicopters. Players earn cosmetics as they level up to customize their soldiers for each faction.

Rising Storm 2: Vietnam went into open beta from May 19 to May 22, 2017 and was officially released for the PC using the software distribution platform Steam on May 30, 2017.

Music
Chris Rickwood and Lennie Moore have returned to score the soundtrack for Rising Storm 2: Vietnam. They were previously employed by Tripwire Interactive to compose the music for 2013's Red Orchestra: Rising Storm. Tripwire also licensed the song Run Through the Jungle by Creedence Clearwater Revival.

Downloadable content
Users were able to pre-purchase the Digital Deluxe edition of the game from April 27 to May 30, 2017. The Digital Deluxe came with two exclusive camouflage boonie hats and the official soundtrack.

On September 2, 2017, Tripwire announced that a DLC adding Australian forces was in the works, with an anticipated release date at the end of the year. 

On November 27, 2017, The "Pulling Rank" Cosmetic DLC was added to the game, adding new cosmetic items only available to purchasers, and an early unlock.

On April 2, 2020 the (fan made) Talvisota: Winter War Mod was released on Steam, which takes place in the Winter War of 1939–1940 between Finland and Soviet Union.

Reception

Critical reception 

Rising Storm 2: Vietnam received generally favorable reviews, according to video game review aggregator Metacritic.

See also

List of Vietnam War games

References

External links
 Official website
 Steam Page
 Tripwire Interactive official website
 Antimatter Games official website

2017 video games
Cooperative video games
Helicopter video games
Multiplayer online games
Video games set in Vietnam
Video games set in the 1960s
Video games set in the 1970s
Vietnam War video games
Tactical shooter video games
Unreal Engine games
Video games about the United States Marine Corps
Video games developed in the United States
Video games developed in the United Kingdom
Video games with Steam Workshop support
Windows games
Windows-only games
Multiplayer and single-player video games
Tripwire Interactive games